Baturaja is a town and the administrative capital of Ogan Komering Ulu Regency in South Sumatra, Indonesia. It has an area of 235.27 square kilometres and a population of 142,099 people (as at the 2020 Census).

Districts
Baturaja is divided into 2 districts of the Regency:
Baturaja Barat (West Baturaja)
Baturaja Timur (East Baturaja)

References 

Regencies of South Sumatra
Regency seats of South Sumatra